Anachronauts may also refer to:

 Anachronauts (comics), a Marvel Comics supervillain team
 Anachronauts (band), a Baton Rouge, Louisiana based surf music band from the 1990s
 Anachronauts audiobook, a Doctor Who audio book by Big Finish